Feminist Africa is a peer-reviewed academic journal that addresses feminist topics from an "African continental perspective". It is published by the African Gender Institute (University of Cape Town). Its founding editor-in-chief is Amina Mama (Mills College and University of California, Davis). It was accredited in 2005 by the South African Department of Education. This allows authors publishing in the journal to collect publication subsidy. The journal is primarily online but also distributes a small number of print copies.

Founding
According to Mama, the journal was created partly in response to a bias in existing scholarship towards the "Women In Development" (WID) perspective. Particular topics covered by the journal include: women's activism, sexism in higher education, militarism and peace, and gender-related violence. Patricia van der Spuy and Lindsay Clowes write that the publication of the journal marked an important step in the development of South African feminism. Iris Berger has critiqued the journal (as an indicator of contemporary African feminism in general) for leaving out colonial and precolonial African women's history.

Feminist Africa is the first "continental" African gender studies journal. The journal publishes works by African scholars in America and discusses the situation of intellectuals across the African diaspora. These international contributors have raised the journal's profile but barred it from receiving Department of Education subsidies. Feminist Africa does not receive funds from the University of Cape Town (although it is edited by salaried UCT workers) and relies on sponsorship by international donors—particularly the Ford Foundation and Hivos.

See also 
 African studies
 African Identities
 Agenda
 Journal of African Cultural Studies
 Journal of Southern African Studies
 List of African studies journals
Feminism in South Africa

References

External links 
 

Open access journals
Gender studies journals
African studies journals
Feminism in South Africa
Publications established in 2002
English-language journals
Creative Commons-licensed journals
Feminist journals
2002 establishments in South Africa
Academic journals published by universities and colleges
Irregular journals